Jennifer Rexford is an American computer scientist who is currently the Gordon Y. S. Wu Professor in Engineering, Professor of Computer Science, and formerly the Chair of the Department of Computer Science at Princeton University. Her research focuses on analysis of computer networks, and in particular network routing, performance measurement, and network management.

Rexford did her undergraduate studies at Princeton, earning a bachelor's degree in electrical engineering in 1991, and then moved to the University of Michigan for  graduate studies in computer science and engineering, earning a master's degree in 1993 and a doctorate in 1996. Her thesis, titled "Tailoring router architectures to performance requirements in cut-through networks", was supervised by Kang G. Shin. She worked at Bell Labs for two summers as a graduate student, and then returned to what had since become AT&T Labs, working there from 1996 to 2005, when she joined the Princeton faculty.

Rexford won the ACM Grace Murray Hopper Award (the award goes to a computer professional who makes a single, significant technical or service contribution at or before age 35) in 2005, for her work on introducing network routing subject to the different business interests of the operators of different subnetworks into Border Gateway Protocol. In 2016, Rexford was named the recipient of the ACM Athena Lecturer award, which recognizes women who have made fundamental contributions to computer science. She became a fellow of the ACM in 2008, and a fellow of the American Academy of Arts and Sciences in 2013. Rexford was elected a member of the National Academy of Engineering in 2014 for contributions to the operational stability of large computer networks. She was also elected a member of the National Academy of Sciences in 2020.

See also
Frenetic (programming language)

References

External links
Home page at Princeton

Year of birth missing (living people)
Living people
American computer scientists
American women computer scientists
Princeton University alumni
University of Michigan College of Engineering alumni
Princeton University faculty
Fellows of the American Academy of Arts and Sciences
Fellows of the Association for Computing Machinery
Place of birth missing (living people)
Grace Murray Hopper Award laureates
American women academics
21st-century American women